An Coiste Téarmaíochta is the Terminology Committee of Foras na Gaeilge. It chooses terminology for words and new concepts in the Irish language.
It was founded in 1968 and was initially a division of the Department of Education.  Under the Good Friday Agreement Foras na Gaeilge was founded in 1999 and was charged with the development of new terminology in Irish. An Coiste Téarmaíochta has been operating as part of the Foras since then. Their work can be found on Téarma.ie.

Membership

There are 20 members on the Coiste Téarmaíochta. They are people from universities, state bodies and language bodies, and experts on various matters. They meet monthly (except for August) in Dublin.

References

Irish language